is a railway station in the town of Minamiaizu, Fukushima Prefecture, Japan, operated by the Aizu Railway Company.

Lines

Station layout
Nakaarai Station has a single side platform serving a single bi-directional track. The station building is a log cabin. The station is unattended.

Adjacent stations

History
Nakaarai Station was opened on 12 December 1947.

Surrounding area

See also
 List of railway stations in Japan

External links

 Aizu Railway Station information 

Aizu Line
Railway stations in Fukushima Prefecture
Railway stations in Japan opened in 1947
Minamiaizu, Fukushima